The 1975 PBA First Conference Finals was the best-of-5 basketball championship series of the 1975 PBA First Conference, and the conclusion of the conference's playoffs. The Toyota Comets and the Crispa Redmanizers played for the inaugural championship contested by the league. The tournament was officially named as an All-Filipino Conference, but it was reclassified in the 2010s as an import-laced tournament since the league gave teams the option to hire foreign players or "imports". This tournament was renamed as the "1975 PBA First Conference" since the 2001 edition of Hardcourt, the official PBA Annual.

The Toyota Comets became the league's very first champion, winning their series in four games against the Crispa Redmanizers.

Qualification

Games summary

Players' scoring averages

(*) Three games only, did not see action in Game four

Broadcast notes

References

External links
 Crispa-Toyota rivalry

1975 PBA season
Crispa Redmanizers games
Toyota Super Corollas games
1975
Crispa–Toyota rivalry
PBA First Conference Finals